Augstenberg is a mountain in Liechtenstein in the Rätikon range of the Eastern Alps close to the border with Austria and the town of Malbun, with a height of .

References

Mountains of the Alps
Mountains of Liechtenstein